Alder's sign, also known as Klein's sign, is a medical sign used to differentiate between appendicitis and tubo-ovarian pathology.

References

Medical signs